The Hitchcock was and automobile built in Warren, Michigan by the Hitchcock Motor Car Company in 1909.  The Hitchcock was a small car, powered by a two-cylinder, two-stroke Speedwell engine of 20 hp.  Very few Hitchcock models were produced.

References
 

Defunct motor vehicle manufacturers of the United States
Motor vehicle manufacturers based in Michigan
Companies based in Macomb County, Michigan
Warren, Michigan